Ralph D. Lorenz is a planetary scientist and engineer at the Johns Hopkins Applied Physics Lab. whose research focuses on understanding surfaces, atmospheres, and their interactions on planetary bodies, especially Titan, Venus, Mars, and Earth. He currently serves as Mission Architect of  Dragonfly, NASA's fourth selected New Frontiers mission, and as participating scientist on Akatsuki  and InSight. 
He is a Co-Investigator on the SuperCam instrument on the Perseverance rover, responsible for interpreting data from its microphone. He leads the Venus Atmospheric Structure Investigation on the DAVINCI Discovery mission to Venus. He is the recipient of the 2020 International Planetary Probe Workshop (IPPW)  Al Seiff memorial award, and the 2022 American Geophysical Union's Fred Whipple Award for contributions to planetary science.

Education 
Lorenz earned a B.Eng. in Aerospace Systems Engineering from the University of Southampton (UK) Department of Aeronautics and Astronautics in 1990. For his thesis "Exploring the Surface of Titan", Lorenz was awarded a PhD in Space Sciences from the University of Kent at Canterbury in 1994. Lorenz spent 1994-2006 at the University of Arizona as a postdoctoral fellow and research scientist. In 2006, he joined the Johns Hopkins Applied Physics Lab.

Research 
Lorenz has published over 200 papers on spacecraft exploration of several bodies of the solar system, using scientific instruments and housekeeping data from engineering systems (such as observing the  Mars environment and a transit of Deimos 
  via the solar array currents on the InSight lander  or measuring the dust and gas in the plumes of Enceladus using Cassini's attitude control system ). He has conducted field research on dust devils, sand dunes and volcanos, exploiting techniques such as kite-borne, timelapse and near-infrared photography.  He has also published on the dynamics of Frisbees, the thermodynamics of the drinking bird toy, and the moving rocks ("Sailing Stones") of Racetrack Playa in Death Valley. He documented the migration of sand dunes at the Mos Espa film set in Tunisia, seen on the Star Wars movies. 
His contributions in scientific history include noting the calculations of Edmond Halley on the size of wings needed for human flight 
, and the definition    of the circumstellar habitable zone by Edward Maunder.

Lorenz has participated in several NASA and ESA missions. He was a Young Graduate Trainee for ESA's Huygens from 1990-1991 and continued on as a member of the Huygens Science Team, designing and building its penetrometer instrument. As a member of the Cassini RADAR team, Lorenz led the planning of Titan radar observations during Cassini's 13 year mission in the Saturn system. Lorenz was selected as a participating scientist on the Japanese mission Akatsuki  in 2010 and NASA's InSight mission at Mars in 2017

He has also been involved in numerous mission concepts, including the Titan Mare Explorer (TiME), the "Billion Dollar Box" Saturnian system study, Titan Airship Explorer, AVIATR, a Mars meteorology and seismology concept, and a Titan submarine

Books

Filmography  
Lorenz has appeared in numerous science documentaries and series, including NOVA, NASA's Unexplained Files, Horizon, and Wonders of the Solar System.

References 

Planetary scientists
Alumni of the University of Southampton
Year of birth missing (living people)
Living people
University of Arizona staff
Alumni of the University of Kent